Darkness Rising may refer to:

Film, television
 Darkness Rising (film), a 2017 horror film
 The Seeker (film), titled The Dark Is Rising in the United Kingdom, a 2007 film loosely based on the series
 An episode in the television series Hercules: The Legendary Journeys
 A five-part episode series of the animated series Transformers Prime

Literature
 The Darkness Rising trilogy, second part of the Darkest Powers series, by Kelley Armstrong
 The Dark Is Rising Sequence, a fantasy series by Susan Cooper

Other
 Dark Age of Camelot: Darkness Rising a 2005 expansion pack for the MMORPG Dark Age of Camelot.
 "Darkness Rising", a song by The Matches from their 2008 album A Band in Hope